Septentrio N.V. is a designer and manufacturer of high-end multi-frequency GNSS receivers. Its main target is to provide GNSS receiver boards and modules for further system integration by Original Equipment Manufacturers (OEMs). Septentrio's core technology is used in various professional fields such as land and airborne surveying, mobile mapping, machine control, precision agriculture, mining, transport, offshore applications, construction, timing and geodesy etc.

History
Septentrio N.V. was incorporated by Peter Grognard in Leuven, Belgium, in January 2000 to commercialize the Satellite Navigation know-how developed at the Interuniversity Micro Electronics Center, the largest independent microelectronics and nanotechnology R&D lab in Belgium. In 2007 Septentrio received the Trends Gazelle award for the fastest rate of growth among Belgian start-up companies.

Location
Septentrio's headquarters are located in Leuven, Belgium. Operations for North and Latin American are based in Torrance, CA and the Asian-Pacific operations are based in Shanghai and Yokohama.

Activities
 
Septentrio has an international team of experts, who cover all the fields of Satellite Navigation technology. The company designs its own chipsets, hardware, firmware and algorithms. Being a provider of high-end receivers for professional use, Septentrio prioritizes the reliability and precision of measurements as well as high degree of flexibility and user control. Septentrio’s products make use of APME, the company’s original multipath-mitigation technology, on-the-fly ambiguity fixing schemes based on the LAMBDA method, and advanced user-controlled RAIM algorithms. Septentrio is also known to first introduce single-board attitude determination systems based on the multi-antenna version of its GPS receivers.

Septentrio’s receivers were used to track experimental  Galileo signals transmitted by the GIOVE-A satellite and were also the first to track the signals of the first experimental satellite of the future Chinese Compass navigation system. In the line of user products the company keeps its focus on multi-system receivers that make use of all the navigation signals available in the sky.

External links 
 
APME multipath mitigation technique
Attitude determination
Triple-frequency combinations of observables 
Tracking Compass signals 
 Trends-Gazelle award April 2007 
Septentrio's receiver at the MIZU geodetic station records the earthquakes
Septentrio reports the tracking of the GLONASS CDMA signal, see also GLONASS-K
Septentrio receives 2013 GPS World Products Leadership Award
Septentrio accepts 2018 GPS World Products Leadership Award

Companies based in Flemish Brabant
Companies based in Leuven
Companies established in 2000
Navigation system companies
Belgian brands